HMS Termagant was a T-class destroyer of the Royal Navy that saw service during the Second World War. She was built by William Denny and Brothers, of Dumbarton and launched on 22 March 1943. She was scrapped in 1965.

Design and construction
The British Admiralty ordered the eight destroyers of the T-class on 14 March 1941 as the 6th Emergency Flotilla. The T-class were War Emergency Programme destroyers, intended for general duties, including use as anti-submarine escort, and were to be suitable for mass-production. They were based on the hull and machinery of the pre-war J-class destroyers, but with a lighter armament (effectively whatever armament was available) in order to speed production. The T-class closely resembled the preceding S-class, but unlike the S-class, were not fitted for operations in the Arctic.

Displacement was  standard and  full load.

The ship had a main gun armament of four 4.7 inch (120 mm) QF Mk. IX guns, capable of elevating to an angle of 55 degrees, giving a degree of anti-aircraft capability. The close-in anti-aircraft armament, varied between ships of the class, but Termagant was fitted with one Hazemayer stabilised twin mount for the Bofors 40 mm gun and eight Oerlikon 20 mm cannons (4 twin mounts). Two quadruple mounts for 21 inch (533 mm) torpedoes were fitted, while the ship had an depth charge outfit of four depth charge mortars and two racks, with a total of 70 charges carried. She was fitted with an extra 40-mm Bofors gun while operating in the Mediterranean in 1944, and later with another Bofors gun when deployed to the Pacific.

Termagant was fitted with a Type 272 surface warning radar and a high-frequency direction finding (HF/DF) aerial on the ship's lattice foremast, together with a Type 291 air warning radar on a pole mast aft. A Type 285 fire control radar integrated with the ship's high-angle gun director. She had a crew of 179 officers and other ranks.

Termagant  was laid down at Denny's Dumbarton shipyard on 25 November 1941 and was launched on 22 March 1943. She was completed on 18 October 1943, and assigned the Pennant number R89.

Type 16 conversion
After the end of the Second World War and as the Cold War started, the Royal Navy found itself with a shortage of fast anti-submarine escorts capable of dealing with modern Soviet diesel-electric submarines, with existing sloops and frigates too slow. At the same time, the relatively recent War Emergency destroyers, with their low-angle guns and basic fire control systems, were considered unsuitable for modern warfare, so it was decided to convert these obsolete destroyers into fast escorts, acting as a stop-gap solution until new-build ships, such as the Type 12 frigates could be built in sufficient numbers. The Type 16 frigate was a simple "second-rate" conversion, less capable than the "first-rate" Type 15, but cheaper and quicker to convert.

The Type 16 conversion involved removing most of the ship's armament and sensors, while retaining the ship's superstructure. Gun armament consisted of a twin 4-inch (102 mm) mount forward of the bridge, with a close-in anti-aircraft armament of seven 40-mm Bofors guns (1 twin and 5 single mounts). Two Squid anti-submarine mortars provided the ship's primary anti-submarine armament, while one quadruple torpedo-tube mount was retained to give a limited anti-surface capability (or to launch homing anti-submarine torpedoes if available). Type 293Q surface/air-search radar was fitted on the mainmast, with Type 274 navigation radar fitted below. Sonar consisted of Type 146B search sonar, Type 147P depth-finding sonar, together with Type 162 sonar for detecting targets on the sea bottom and Type 174 for control of the Squid mortars.

Termagant was converted by Grayson Rollo at Birkenhead from August 1951 to April 1953.

Service

Second World War
After working up at Scapa Flow, Termagant formed part of the local escort for the Arctic convoy JW54A for the initial leg of the convoy from 15 to 18 November 1943, when it was relieved by the convoy's Ocean escort. She was then sent to join the Mediterranean Fleet, arriving at Alexandria on 14 January 1944 to join the 24th Destroyer Flotilla, having escorted the battleships ,  and the battlecruiser  on her passage to the Mediterranean, as the capital ships made their way to the Eastern Fleet.
 
On the night of 12/13 February 1944, Termagant and sister ship  shelled Vela Luka in Croatia and on 6/7 April bombarded Bar, Montenegro. On 19 May, the German submarine  attacked a convoy off the heel of Italy, sinking the merchant ship . On 15 August 1944, Termagant took part in Operation Dragoon, the Allied invasion of Southern France, providing fire support for the landings. She remained on duty off the South of France until 28 August.

In September 1944, Germany started to evacuate its troops from islands in the Aegean and from southern Greece, and in response, the British launched an offensive to disrupt the evacuation, with the Royal Navy deploying a task force consisting of seven escort carriers, supported by cruisers and destroyers, with the force including Termagant. On 19 October Termagant and Tuscan intercepted and sank the German torpedo boat TA18 (formerly the Italian ) off Volos.

On 1 November 1944, with major operations in the Aegean ended, Termagant set out for Britain, arriving at Portsmouth on 11 November, and was refitted in preparation for operations in the Pacific. The refit was completed at the end of January 1945, and after working up in Malta, sailed via Trincomalee in Ceylon to join the British Pacific Fleet at its base in Australia, receiving the new pennant number D47 for operations in the Pacific. In May 1945, Termagant operated in support of the British Pacific Fleets carriers during operations in support of the Okinawa campaign. On 14–15 June, Termagant formed part of the escort for the aircraft carrier  for Operation Inmate, an attack on the Japanese base at Truk Atoll intended to provide combat experience for Implacables crew ahead of operations off Japan. Termagant again supported the British carrier fleet during operations against Japan in July 1945, and remained on station into August that year, and was present at the signing of the Surrender of Japan in Tokyo Bay on 2 September.

Postwar
Between 1946 and 1951 Termagant was held in reserve at Portsmouth. In August 1951, she was towed to Grayson & Rollo's Birkenhead yard from conversion to a Type 16 fast anti-submarine frigate. Despite these incidents, Termagant recommissioned on 28 April 1953 with the new pennant number F189. After commissioning she joined the 3rd Submarine Flotilla at Rothesay as a target ship. In the same year she took part in the Fleet Review to celebrate the Coronation of Queen Elizabeth II.

On 26 September 1957 Termagant returned to the reserve at Devonport, being replaced by the Type 14 frigate  in the 3rd Submarine Flotilla. She re-commissioning briefly in 1958 for trials.

Decommissioning and disposal
After decommissioning for the last time Termagant was held in reserve at Lisahally between 1961 and 1965. She was then sold for scrapping in 1965 to Arnott Young, Dalmuir, arriving there on 5 November 1965.

References

Publications
 
 
 
 
 
 
 
  
 
 
 
 
 
 
 
 
 
 
 

 

S and T-class destroyers
Ships built on the River Clyde
1943 ships
World War II destroyers of the United Kingdom
Cold War destroyers of the United Kingdom
Type 16 frigates
Cold War frigates of the United Kingdom